Johannes Lodewikus Goosen (born 27 July 1992) is a South African professional rugby union player. He plays as a fly-half, full-back or centre for the Bulls and the Blue Bulls, competing in the United Rugby Championship and the Currie Cup.

Career

Youth
He was a member of the South Africa Under 20 team that competed in the 2011 IRB Junior World Championship and was also named in the squad for the 2012 tournament, but had to withdraw due to a shoulder injury sustained on 28 April in a Super Rugby match against the Highlanders. At the time of his injury, Goosen was the leading points scorer in his debut season of super rugby with 145 points from 9 games. The total included 3 tries, 17 conversions, 31 penalties and a drop goal.

International debut
Goosen made his South African debut on 8 September 2012 against Australia in a 26–19 defeat in Perth. He came off the bench as replacement fly half for Morné Steyn in the 59th minute of the game. The following two weekends he was in the starting line-up for the Springboks as fly-half, where he performed well. Unfortunately he suffered a knee injury on 18 March 2013 during a Cheetah training session in Sydney and he also missed the rest of the Springboks' Test matches in 2013.

Departure to France and temporary career-ending
Goosen signed a three-year deal with French Top 14 side Racing 92 for the 2014–15 Top 14 season. In the final of the 2015–16 Top 14 season Goosen scored three penalties as Racing defeated Toulon. Despite later signing a contract extension to remain in Paris until 2020, he later announced his retirement from rugby in December 2016 to take up a role as a commercial director at an agricultural company in South Africa. Goosen has since opened up about believing this decision to have been a mistake.

Return to rugby
Goosen made his return to competitive rugby in April 2018 when he was named in the matchday squad for the ' match against Munster in Round 20 of the Pro14 competition.

Goosen then signed for French giants Montpellier back in the Top 14 competition ahead of the 2019–19 season. The club reportedly paid around €1.5 million to buy him out from his Racing contract. He rewarded the faith by helping his team toward winning the European Challenge Cup in 2021, putting in a man-of-the-match performance against Leicester in the final.

On 16 April 2021, Goosen returned to South Africa to sign for the Bulls for the next season.

Style of play
Being able to play at several positions (fly-half, centre and full-back), he can usually be described as a utility back.

Honours

Racing 92
 Top 14 winner 2015–16
 European Rugby Champions Cup runner up 2015–16

Montpellier
 European Rugby Challenge Cup winner 2020-21

References

External links

itsrugby.co.uk profile

Living people
1992 births
South African rugby union players
South Africa international rugby union players
Rugby union fly-halves
Cheetahs (rugby union) players
Free State Cheetahs players
Afrikaner people
South African people of Dutch descent
Alumni of Grey College, Bloemfontein
People from Burgersdorp
South Africa Under-20 international rugby union players
South African expatriate rugby union players
South African expatriate sportspeople in France
Expatriate rugby union players in France
Racing 92 players
Montpellier Hérault Rugby players
Blue Bulls players
Bulls (rugby union) players
Rugby union players from the Eastern Cape